Alma Corsária is a 1993 Brazilian drama film directed by Carlos Reichenbach.

Cast 
Bertrand Duarte .... Rivaldo Torres
Jandir Ferrari .... Teodoro Xavier
Andréa Richa .... Anésia
Flor .... Verinha
Mariana de Moraes .... Eliana
Jorge Fernando .... Magalhães
Emílio Di Biasi .... pai de Anésia / tio de Artur
Abrahão Farc .... suicidal
Roberto Miranda .... prophet
Paulo Marrafão .... Oscar
David Ypond .... China
Carolina Ferraz .... Angel
Chris Couto .... Janete
Amazyles de Almeida .... Olga
André Messias .... Torres, young
Denis Peres .... Xavier, young
Walter Forster .... Xavier's father
Bruno de André .... editor

See also 
Abraccine Top 100 Brazilian films

References

External links 
 

1993 films
1990s Portuguese-language films
Brazilian drama films
Films directed by Walter Lima Jr.
Best Picture APCA Award winners
1993 drama films